Saighton Grange originated as a monastic grange. It was later converted into a country house and, as of 2013, the building is used as a school (Abbey Gate College). It is located in Saighton, Cheshire, England. The only surviving part of the monastic grange is the gatehouse, which is recorded in the National Heritage List for England as a designated Grade I listed building, and is one of only two surviving monastic manorial buildings in Cheshire, the other being Ince Manor. The rest of the building is listed at Grade II, as is its chapel.

History
The manor of Saighton was held by the secular canons of St Werburgh in Chester before the Norman Conquest. In the Domesday Book of 1086 it is listed as Saltone. In 1093 it was granted to the Benedictine monks of St Werburgh's Abbey by Hugh Lupus. The site was given a licence to crenellate in 1399, and this was confirmed in 1410, but the privilege was apparently not acted upon: "Saighton was primarily an agricultural centre until it was converted to residential use in the fifteenth century". The manor house was built about 1489 for Simon Ripley, Abbot of St Werburgh's. Following the dissolution of the monasteries the manor passed through several hands and in time the house was separated from the manor. In the 1840s the house was bought by the 2nd Marquess of Westminster.

The monastic buildings, other than the gatehouse, were demolished in 1861 and were replaced by a house designed by Edward Hodkinson for the 2nd Marquess of Westminster. Alterations were made to the house in about 1870–72 and again in 1894–96 by the Chester architect John Douglas for the 1st Duke of Westminster. In the 1880s the building was occupied by Earl Grosvenor. The garden were redesigned in 1901–02 by Harry Inigo Triggs. The buildings were converted into a school in 1977 and it now forms Abbey Gate College, which is a private coeducational school for pupils aged 4–18.

Architecture

Gatehouse
This dates from 1490, and was built in front of an earlier wide-arched vehicular entry. It is constructed in red sandstone and has three storeys, with string courses between the storeys. It is surmounted by a crenellated parapet. The lower 1½ storeys of the front aspect are occupied by a pointed arch, above which are three narrow windows. In the upper storey are two four-light mullioned windows. On the left side is a three-light oriel window with a four-light mullioned window above, and in the merlon above this is a niche containing a statue. On the right side is a blocked arch in the ground floor, a single-light window above it and a four-light mullioned window in the top storey. In the angle between the gateway and the newer building, on the left, is a square turret that is taller than the rest of the gatehouse.

House
The rest of the house is also built in red sandstone and it has a tiled roof. The main wing has two storeys and flanks the gatehouse, with two bays to its left and three bays to the right. It is in Tudor style with battlements and stepped gables. The right wing also has two storeys with a three-storey cross wing.

Chapel
The chapel was built in about 1870 in red sandstone with a tiled roof. It is a rectangular building with gables. On one of the gables is an open bellcote with one bell under a square spire. There are four windows containing stained glass; three of these date from the late 19th century, the other from the late 20th century.

Grounds
In the grounds are part of the medieval boundary wall which is built of sandstone rubble. This stands on bedrock on the edge of a rock cutting and is thought to have been a form of light fortification. The walls are listed Grade II. The grounds consist of formal gardens, surrounded by informal parkland. The gardens are open occasionally under the National Garden Scheme.

See also

Grade I listed buildings in Cheshire West and Chester
Grade I listed non-ecclesiastical buildings in Cheshire
Listed buildings in Saighton
List of houses and associated buildings by John Douglas

References

External links
Abbey Gate College

Religious buildings and structures completed in 1490
Houses completed in 1861
Grade I listed buildings in Cheshire
Grade II listed buildings in Cheshire
English Gothic architecture in Cheshire
Grade I listed gates
Gardens in Cheshire
John Douglas buildings
Country houses in Cheshire